Matthew Derrick Williams (born November 28, 1965), nicknamed "Matt the Bat" and "The Big Marine" is an American professional baseball manager and former third baseman who is the third base coach for the San Diego Padres. A right-handed batter, Williams played in Major League Baseball for the San Francisco Giants, Cleveland Indians, and Arizona Diamondbacks. He managed the Washington Nationals from 2014 to 2015.

During these years, Williams became the only player to hit at least one World Series home run for three different Major League baseball teams. During his career, Williams had an overall batting average of .268, with 378 home runs and 1,218 runs batted in (RBIs). He scored 997 Major League runs, and he accumulated 1,878 hits, 338 doubles, and 35 triples, while playing in 1,866 regular-season games.

Early life
Williams originally was selected by the New York Mets in the 27th round from Carson High School in Carson City, Nevada, but he did not sign with the Mets. Williams was the starting quarterback on the Carson Senators football team in high school. Two of his teammates who played baseball in high school, Bob Ayrault and Charlie Kerfeld, also played baseball in the major leagues.

College career
Williams accepted a baseball scholarship to play for the University of Nevada, Las Vegas.

Professional career

San Francisco Giants (1987–1996)
Williams was drafted by the San Francisco Giants in the first round (the 3rd pick) of the 1986 pro baseball draft. Williams began his major league career in 1987 primarily as a shortstop for the Giants while playing some games at third base also. He played both shortstop and third base until the 1990 season when he became the starting third baseman for the Giants and went on to lead the National League in Runs Batted In with 122 while making the National League All Star team. Despite suffering from several leg injuries and some lower-back ailments, Williams was an excellent fielder at third base, and a dangerous and productive hitter. As a third baseman, Williams had good reflexes and excellent hands, with a quick release and strong, accurate arm. During his career, he earned four Gold Glove Awards, all between 1991 and 1997.

A hitter with exceptional power, six times he hit more than 30 home runs in a season as a Giant, with more than 90 runs batted in. His best season was 1994 when he hit a National League-best 43 home runs and had an impressive 96 runs batted in (RBI) in only 112 games as the Major League Baseball season was shortened by nearly one-third because of a season-ending strike by Major League baseball players. He was on pace to challenge the single season home run record of 61, at the time held by Roger Maris, with his 43 home runs in 115 games projecting to 60.6 home runs at season's end. Williams finished second in the voting for the National League Most Valuable Player Award that year behind first baseman Jeff Bagwell of the Houston Astros.

Cleveland Indians (1997)
Williams was traded to Cleveland after the 1996 season in a six-player trade that worked out for both teams; the Giants received future NL MVP Jeff Kent in the deal.

In 1997, while Williams' streak of three straight All-Star selections ended, he exceeded 30 HRs and 100 RBIs and won a Gold Glove and Silver Slugger, all for the first time since 1994. He also helped lead Cleveland to its second American League pennant in three years, although the Indians lost the World Series in seven games to the Florida Marlins. After his divorce from his first wife Tracie, Williams requested and received a trade to the Arizona Diamondbacks to be closer to his children.

Arizona Diamondbacks (1998–2003)

Williams was an original member of the Arizona Diamondbacks from the club's inaugural season in 1998. He holds the Diamondbacks record for the most RBIs in one season with a total of 142 during 1999; the record has since been tied by Luis Gonzalez in 2001, but has never been exceeded.

Williams was a partial owner of the Diamondbacks, and carried the title of "Special Assistant to the General Partner". Williams occasionally also served as color commentator during Diamondbacks radio and television broadcasts, and also assisted in coaching and with player personnel matters.

Williams was hired in November 2009 by the Diamondbacks to be the first base coach for 2010. Williams moved from first base coach to third base coach for the 2011 season, while working under first-year manager Kirk Gibson.

Managerial career

Washington Nationals (2014–2015)
On October 31, 2013, the Washington Nationals announced that they had hired Williams to replace Davey Johnson as their manager for the 2014 season. Prior to the 2015 season, the Nationals exercised an option to extend Williams through the 2016 season.
Williams managed the Nationals to a NL East division title and the playoffs, but lost the NLDS to the San Francisco Giants. Williams was named the 2014 National League Manager of the Year.

On October 5, 2015, the Nationals terminated Williams after a disappointing season where they were World Series favorites and failed to make the postseason. He finished with a record of 179 wins and 145 losses.

Kia Tigers (2020–2021)
Williams joined the Kia Tigers of the KBO League, becoming their first American-born manager before the 2020 season. On November 5, 2021, it was announced that Williams would not be returning to the team in 2022 after the club finished in ninth place with a 58–75 record in 2021.

Managerial record

Coaching career
Williams coached for the Arizona Diamondbacks from 2010 through 2014 before he managed the Washington Nationals in 2014 and 2015. He was hired as the Oakland Athletics' third base coach in November 2017, staying with them through the 2019 season.

On December 17, 2021, Williams was hired by the San Diego Padres to serve as the team's third base coach for the 2022 season.

Other work
Williams joined NBC Sports Bay Area in 2017 as a studio analyst, appearing before and after San Francisco Giants telecasts.

Steroid use
On November 6, 2007, the San Francisco Chronicle reported that Williams purchased $11,600 worth of human growth hormone, steroids and other drugs from the Palm Beach clinic in 2002. Williams later told the Chronicle he used HGH on the advice of a doctor to treat an ankle injury he suffered during spring training in 2002.

On December 13, 2007, he was named among the dozens of players alleged to have used steroids in the Mitchell Report, commissioned by Major League Baseball and written by former Senator George J. Mitchell.

Hall of Fame candidacy
Williams became eligible for the National Baseball Hall of Fame in 2009. He received just 1.3% of the votes, and was dropped from the ballot.

Personal life
Williams has been married three times. His first wife, Tracie, left with their three children for another.  His second wife (January 1999 – July 2002) was film actress Michelle Johnson. She filed for divorce in 2002, listing irreconcilable differences as the reason. The couple had no children, and in July 2002 their divorce was final. In 2003, Williams became engaged to Phoenix news anchor Erika Monroe, who is a TV news anchor from KTVK-TV, a TV hostess and creator of the cooking and lifestyle website, The Hopeless Housewife; they married in 2003. In 2007 the couple co-hosted the weekend pre-game shows for the Arizona Diamondbacks called "DBacks on Deck". They have one child and live in Bel Air, California.

Williams is the grandson of former major league outfielder Bert Griffith.

See also

 List of Major League Baseball career home run leaders
 List of Major League Baseball career runs batted in leaders
 List of Major League Baseball annual runs batted in leaders
 List of Major League Baseball annual home run leaders
 List of Major League Baseball players named in the Mitchell Report

References

External links

 Retrosheet

1965 births
Living people
All-American college baseball players
Arizona Diamondbacks announcers
Arizona Diamondbacks coaches
Arizona Diamondbacks executives
Arizona Diamondbacks players
Baseball coaches from California
Baseball players from California
Cleveland Indians players
Clinton Giants players
Drugs in sport in the United States
El Paso Diablos players
Everett Giants players
Gold Glove Award winners
High Desert Mavericks players
Lancaster JetHawks players
Major League Baseball broadcasters
Major League Baseball first base coaches
Major League Baseball third base coaches
Major League Baseball third basemen
Manager of the Year Award winners
National League All-Stars
National League home run champions
National League RBI champions
Oakland Athletics coaches
Phoenix Firebirds players
People from Bishop, California
San Francisco Giants players
San Jose Giants players
Silver Slugger Award winners
Tucson Sidewinders players
UNLV Rebels baseball players
Washington Nationals managers